Nigeria operates a two-tier honours system. Whereas the national honours of Nigeria are within the gift of the Federal Government itself, titles in the Nigerian chieftaincy system fall under the purview of the monarchs of the sub-national traditional states of the country. A number of the Heads of State that have served since Independence in 1960 have therefore held such traditional titles, either due to their hereditary background or to their personal achievement.

Monarch (1960–1963)
The succession to the Nigerian throne was the same as the succession to the British one.

Governor-General
The Governor-General was the representative of the monarch in Nigeria and exercised most of the powers of the monarch. The Governor-General was appointed for an indefinite term, serving at the pleasure of the monarch.

First Republic (1963–1966)
Under the 1963 Constitution, the first constitution of the Republic of Nigeria, Nigeria ran the parliamentary system of government with a prime minister and the President replacing the monarch as ceremonial head of state.

Military rule (1966–1979)
In 1966, Major Chukwuma Kaduna Nzeogwu led a bloody coup d'état which overthrew the First Nigerian Republic.

Second Republic (1979–1983)
Under the 1979 Constitution, the second constitution of the Republic of Nigeria, the President was head of both state and government.

Military rule (1983–1993)
Major-General Muhammadu Buhari led a coup d'état which overthrew President Shagari and his government.

Interim National Government (1993)
Following the annulment of the 1993 Nigerian presidential election which terminated the transition to the Third Nigerian Republic, General Babangida resigned from office. He signed a decree establishing the Interim National Government led by Chief Ernest Shonekan.

Military rule (1993–1999)
In November 1993, General Sani Abacha overthrew the interim government, and ruled the country with an iron fist thereafter. In 1998, following Abacha's death, General Abdulsalami Abubakar became head of state and ushered in the Fourth Nigerian Republic.

Fourth Republic (1999–present)
Under the fourth Constitution of the Republic of Nigeria, the President is head of both state and government.

Status

Notes and references

Nigeria-related lists
Politics of Nigeria
Titles